The 2022 Island X-Prix (formally the 2022 Neom Island X-Prix) was a pair of Extreme E off-road races that was held on 6, 7, 9 and 10 July 2022 at Capo Teulada, in the Sulcis-Iglesiente region of the Italian island of Sardinia. It marked the second and third rounds of the electric off-road racing car series' second season, as well as the second running of the event. Though initially scheduled to host only the second round in May, it was later turned into a double header and postponed to July when the third round, originally planned to take place in Scotland or Senegal, was cancelled due to financial issues. As such, the two events were treated as separate competitions and distinguished in official documents as the "Island X-Prix I" and "Island X-Prix II".

Kyle LeDuc and Sara Price won their first X-Prix for GMC Hummer EV Chip Ganassi Racing in the first round, ahead of Xite Energy Racing and JBXE, after a penalty for on-track winners Rosberg X Racing. Championship leaders Johan Kristoffersson and Mikaela Åhlin-Kottulinsky from Rosberg X Racing dominated the second event, with Team X44 and Genesys Andretti United Extreme E rounding out the podium.

Classification

Round 2

Qualifying

Notes:
 Tie-breakers were determined by Super Sector times.

Semi-final 1

Semi-final 2

Crazy Race

Notes:
  – Abt Cupra XE originally finished first, but later received a 10-second time penalty for taking down a waypoint flag and a 22-second time penalty for failing to reach the minimum driver switch time in the switch zone.

Final

Notes:
 The race was red-flagged at the end of lap 1 after a crash between Rosberg X Racing's Johan Kristoffersson and Acciona  Sainz's Carlos Sainz that took the latter out of the race. All four other teams took the restart, with the gaps maintained.
  – Team awarded 5 additional points for being fastest in the Super Sector.
  – JBXE received a 7-second time penalty for taking down a waypoint flag.
  – Rosberg X Racing originally finished first, but was later penalised for causing the collision with the Acciona  Sainz XE Team. This was initially in the form of a 30-second time penalty. However, after new evidence became available and Acciona  Sainz appealed the decision, on 19 August (six weeks after the incident) the initial time penalty was cancelled and Rosberg X Racing was demoted to last place.

Round 3

Qualifying

Notes:
 Tie-breakers were determined by Super Sector times.

Semi-final 1

Semi-final 2

Crazy Race

Final

Notes:
  – Team awarded 5 additional points for being fastest in the Super Sector.
  – Abt Cupra XE originally finished second, but was later disqualified for Jutta Kleinschmidt not fitting her right shoulder strap during the driver switch and driving a lap not fastened. As a result, the team got 0 points from the event.

References

External links
 

|- style="text-align:center"
|width="35%"|Previous race:2022 Desert X-Prix
|width="30%"|Extreme E Championship2022 season
|width="35%"|Next race:2022 Copper X-Prix
|- style="text-align:center"
|width="35%"|Previous race:2021 Island X-Prix
|width="30%"|Island X-Prix
|width="35%"|Next race:N/A
|- style="text-align:center"

Island X-Prix
Island X-Prix
Island X-Prix